Honcut (formerly, Moores Station) is a census-designated place in Butte County, California. It lies at an elevation of 108 feet (33 m).  Lower Honcut Rd. links the community to California State Route 70. Honcut is near the Yuba County line. Honcut's post office was established in 1856 and moved back and forth several times between Butte and Yuba Counties, before being closed for good in 1943.  Moores Station (named for John C. Moore, first postmaster) post office was opened in 1869, closed in 1875, reopened in 1876, and closed for good in 1892. Honcut's population was 370 at the 2010 census.

Demographics

The 2010 United States Census reported that Honcut had a population of 370. The racial makeup of Honcut was 248 (67.0%) White, 6 (1.6%) African American, 14 (3.8%) Native American, 4 (1.1%) Asian, 0 (0.0%) Pacific Islander, 85 (23.0%) from other races, and 13 (3.5%) from two or more races. Hispanic or Latino of any race were 145 persons (39.2%).

The Census reported that 370 people (100% of the population) lived in households, 0 (0%) lived in non-institutionalized group quarters, and 0 (0%) were institutionalized.

There were 106 households, out of which 49 (46.2%) had children under the age of 18 living in them, 62 (58.5%) were opposite-sex married couples living together, 11 (10.4%) had a female householder with no husband present, 12 (11.3%) had a male householder with no wife present.  There were 10 (9.4%) unmarried opposite-sex partnerships, and 2 (1.9%) same-sex married couples or partnerships. 14 households (13.2%) were made up of individuals, and 6 (5.7%) had someone living alone who was 65 years of age or older. The average household size was 3.49.  There were 85 families (80.2% of all households); the average family size was 3.78.

The population was spread out, with 113 people (30.5%) under the age of 18, 24 people (6.5%) aged 18 to 24, 93 people (25.1%) aged 25 to 44, 91 people (24.6%) aged 45 to 64, and 49 people (13.2%) who were 65 years of age or older.  The median age was 36.8 years. For every 100 females, there were 104.4 males.  For every 100 females age 18 and over, there were 125.4 males.

The homeowner vacancy rate was 0%; the rental vacancy rate was 0%.  267 people (72.2% of the population) lived in owner-occupied housing units and 103 people (27.8%) lived in rental housing units.

References

Census-designated places in Butte County, California
Census-designated places in California